Bayete or Bayeté may refer to:
Bayete, a South African band led by Jabu Khanyile
An alias of Todd Cochran
A tribute given to Cecil Rhodes by Matabele leaders at his funeral in 1902, "the first time accorded to a white man"
Bayeté, a traditional Zulu royal salute